Asquith ministry may refer to:

 First Asquith ministry, the British majority government led by H. H. Asquith from 1908 to January 1910
 Second Asquith ministry, the British minority government led by H. H. Asquith from January 1910 to December 1910
 Third Asquith ministry, the British minority government led by H. H. Asquith from December 1910 to 1915
 Fourth Asquith ministry, the British coalition government led by H. H. Asquith from 1915 to 1916